Geismar is a Thuringian municipality in the district Eichsfeld, in Thuringia, Germany

Geismar may also refer to:

Places
 Ershausen/Geismar, a Verwaltungsgemeinschaft ("collective municipality") in the district Eichsfeld, in Thuringia, Germany
 Geismar, a municipality in the above
 Geismar, Louisiana, an unincorporated area in Ascension Parish
 Geismar, an incorporated village of Göttingen, Germany

People
 Gédéon Geismar (1863-1931), a French Brigadier-General
Bertel Geismar Haarder (born 1944), a Danish politician
 Friedrich Caspar von Geismar, also known as Fyodor Geismar (1783–1848), an Austrian-German military officer
 Jårg Geismar (born 1958), a German artist
Léon Geismar (born 1895), a French politician
Luc Geismar (born 1966), French politician
 Maxwell Geismar (1909–1979), an American author
 Tom Geismar (born 1931), an American graphic designer
 Alain Geismar (born 1939), French politician

Other
 Chermayeff & Geismar & Haviv, a New York-based branding and graphic design firm